Ekerete Udoh  (born 2 April 1963 in Onna, Akwa Ibom State) is a Nigerian politician, Journalist and Chief Press Secretary to Akwa Ibom State Governor. Ekerete is also a former columnist in ThisDay Newspaper and Vice Chairman of News of the World Newspaper, Lagos.

Education 
Ekerete Udoh attended Queensborough Community College, New York and graduated with an Associate Degree in Liberal Arts before attending Queens College, City University of New York and graduated with Bachelor of Arts Degree and finally got a Master of Arts Degree from Brooklyn College, City University of New York.

Honors 
 Harold Stolerman Award for Excellence in English - 2004
 Joseph Geist Award for Excellence in American History - 2004
 New York State Senate for Outstanding work on Community Relations - 2012

Nominations 
 International Scholar Laureate Program in Diplomacy (Golden Key) - 2005
 Urban Fellow-New York City Government - 2005

References 

Akwa Ibom State politicians
Living people
1963 births
Queens College, City University of New York alumni
Brooklyn College alumni